Mary Benton Faber (born in Greenville, North Carolina) is an American actress. She graduated from the Governor's School for the Arts and Brandeis University.

Stage career
Faber made her Broadway debut on December 26, 2005, replacing Stephanie D'Abruzzo in the musical Avenue Q. She played the big-hearted Kate Monster and the easy Lucy T. Slut. Starting October 30, 2006, she took a leave of absence from Avenue Q to appear as Clea in the Playwright's Horizon's production of Floyd and Clea Under the Western Sky. Faber returned to Avenue Q on December 19, 2006. Faber's last appearance in Avenue Q was on October 9, 2008.

Faber has appeared in off-Broadway shows including Saved! at Playwright's Horizons, Slut, and The Tutor. Faber also previously worked in the Theatreworks musical Junie B. Jones. Mary helped to develop the character of Natalie in Feeling Electric (which would eventually be redeveloped into the Pulitzer Prize winning Next to Normal). She starred in The Corn is Green alongside Kate Burton at the Huntington Theater in Boston. Between theater jobs, Faber is known to moonlight at improvisational clubs including the Upright Citizens Brigade, The Riot Act, and The Second City.

Faber originated the role of Heather in the musical American Idiot while the show was being developed at Berkeley Repertory Theatre. She continued the role of Heather from the opening of its Broadway run until December 12, 2010.

She starred as Smitty in the 2011 revival  How to Succeed in Business Without Really Trying alongside Daniel Radcliffe and John Larroquette, from the opening of the run until February 26, 2012.

Faber had a recurring role on Parks and Recreation as Pawnee restaurant lobbyist Kathryn Pinewood and has also made guest appearances on Nurse Jackie and The Good Wife.

Personal life
Faber is married to the musician Gabe Witcher, best known for playing fiddle in the progressive bluegrass group the Punch Brothers since September 15, 2013. The pair have two sons together.

Filmography

External links

References

Living people
People from Greenville, North Carolina
American female dancers
American dancers
American film actresses
American musical theatre actresses
American television actresses
American video game actresses
American voice actresses
Actresses from North Carolina
21st-century American actresses
21st-century American singers
21st-century American women singers
Year of birth missing (living people)